The Governor of North Borneo was the appointed head of the government of North Borneo.

Originally the Governor was appointed by the North Borneo Chartered Company, which was responsible for the administration of the protectorate.  Upon North Borneo becoming a Crown colony in 1946, in the aftermath of the Second World War, the Governor of British North Borneo became an appointee of the Crown (i.e. of the Government of the United Kingdom).

List of governors appointed by the Company

Sources 
 List of North Borneo Governors on World Statesmen

North Borneo, Gov

North Borneo
North Borneo, Gov
North Borneo, Gov
History of North Borneo